Cecrita is a genus of prominent moths in the family Notodontidae. There are about eight described species in Cecrita, found in North, Central, and South America.

Species
These eight species belong to the genus Cecrita:
 Cecrita belfragei Grote, 1879
 Cecrita biundata Walker, 1855 (wavy-lined heterocampa)
 Cecrita cubana Grote, 1866 (Cuban heterocampa moth)
 Cecrita franclemonti Miller, 2021
 Cecrita guttivitta (Walker, 1855) (saddled prominent)
 Cecrita incongrua Barnes & Benjamin, 1924 (Dog's-tooth violet)
 Cecrita lunata H. Edwards, 1884
 Cecrita plumosa Miller, 2021

References

Notodontidae